The Canadian Federation of Jewish Students (CFJS) or Federation Canadienne Des Etudiants Juifs (FCEJ), in French, was the representative organization of Jewish students across Canada. It was founded by leaders of Jewish student groups across the country in January 2004 in Ottawa and became defunct in 2011.

The CFJS Executive was made up of an elected President and four Vice-Presidents as well as a number of Committee Chairs and 'Members at Large' chosen by the elected portion of the executive. Elections were conducted on a proportional basis, with each university's campus being allotted 1 vote for every 500 Jewish students studying there, to a maximum of 5.  CFJS was governed in part by a Congress, with representatives chosen by Jewish students at each university.

History
The Canadian Federation of Jewish Students was founded by the leaders of Jewish student groups across the country in January 2004 and exists to empower the Canadian Jewish student community. Since its founding, the CFJS has gained national recognition, most notably holding  major national conferences from across Canada.

CFJS has been noted for hosting an annual conference of Canadian Jewish leadership (Hillel and Jewish Students Association (JSA) presidents, Israel advocates, Alpha Epsilon Pi fraternity leaders, et cetera).  In the early years of CFJS, this conference was held at a camp in Parry Sound, Ontario.  However, more recently, its annual conference has been moved to Guelph, Ontario.

In September 2008, CFJS partnered with several other Jewish organization to send approximately 300 students to New York to protest "incitement to genocide" by Iranian president Mahmoud Ahmadinejad, who was speaking that week at the United Nations.

In the spring of 2009, CFJS assembled its congress - representatives of the major Jewish organizations from each Canadian campus - in Toronto, for leadership development, and elections of the CFJS executive.  Speakers at the Congress included Jason Kenney, Canada's Minister of Citizenship, Immigration and Multiculturalism.

In early 2010, CFJS launched Milim, a publication devoted Canadian Jewish student art and literature.

Principles
All of the organization's activities are based on the following five principles:

Representation and Student Voice
CFJS helps to connect Jewish students on local campuses across Canada to both the Jewish and non-Jewish communities in Canada, Israel, and the world. CFJS takes its lead from the diverse and numerous Jewish groups on campus, advocating for students and helping their voices be heard.

Convening and Uniting
CFJS helps to connect students from Victoria to London, Winnipeg to Halifax, and to physically bring them together to see and feel the common bond they share with their fellow Jewish students across the country.

Leadership Development
CFJS works to identify and cultivate the diverse qualities of students, in order to help the Jewish student community in Canada continue to thrive and to shape tomorrow and today.

Canadian Jewish Identity Development
CFJS believes students can take pride in their freedoms, and works to promote, develop, and defend this pride. It encourages students to explore and express their own Jewish identity and connection to Israel while cherishing Canadian ideals and values.

National Communication
CFJS helps to facilitate communication between students on a local, regional, and national level and to establish a network among them. CFJS enables individuals to share resources, ideas and best practices with other Jewish students in all parts of the country.

Representation

CFJS strives to represent Jewish students and their concerns and interests to outside organizations, including but not limited to national Jewish and student organizations as well as international Jewish student organizations and in the news media. This representation exists through the consent and support of local campus-based Jewish student groups.

2010-2011 Elected Executive

 President: Aaron Vomberg, Dalhousie University
 VP Internal: Rebecca Cherniak, McMaster University
 VP External: Paige MacPherson, Dalhousie University
 VP Programming: Shira Fenyes, University of Saskatchewan
 VP Finance: Allie Novack, McGill University
 Immediate Past President: Samantha Banks, Concordia University

2010-2011 Board

 Graduate Student Chair: Noah Kadish, York University
 Graduate Student Chair: Matt Rutchik, University of Toronto
 Communication Chair: Ashley Faintuch, University of Winnipeg
 Tzedec & Jewish Identity Chair: Maddie Axelrod, Queen's University
 Tzedec & Jewish Identity Chair: Adam Moscoe, University of Ottawa
 Campaigns Chair: Allie Cuperfain, University of Toronto
 Campaigns Chair: Jeff Greenberg, University of Guelph
 Advisory: Moishie Kahan, Université de Montréal, Noah Kochman University of Ottawa

CFJS also has representation on the following bodies:

 CIJA - The Canadian Council for Jewish and Israel Advocacy
 NJCL - National Jewish Campus Life
 CIC - Canada-Israel Committee
 UIA Federations Canada
 Hillel International
 World Union of Jewish Students

References

External links
 Canadian Federation of Jewish Students

Jewish youth organizations
Zionism in Canada
Students' associations in Canada